Hayley Mulheron (born 27 April 1986) is a Scotland netball international. She captained Scotland at the 2015 Netball World Cup. She also represented Scotland at the 2007 and 2019 Netball World Cups and at the 2014 and 2018 Commonwealth Games. At club level, she has played for Glasgow Wildcats, Team Northumbria and Sirens in the Netball Superleague and for Canberra Darters and New South Wales Waratahs in the Australian Netball League.

Playing career

Netball Superleague
Glasgow Wildcats
Between 2008 and 2011, Mulheron played for Glasgow Wildcats in the Netball Superleague.

Team Northumbria
Mulheron has had two spells playing for Team Northumbria in the Netball Superleague. She first played for them in 2015. She returned to play for Team Northumbria in 2018.

Sirens
Mulheron has also had two spells playing for Sirens. She first played for them in 2017. She rejoined Sirens in 2018 and played for them in the 2018 Netball New Zealand Super Club and in the 2018 British Fast5 Netball All-Stars Championship. She also played for Sirens during the 2019 Netball Superleague season.

Australian Netball League
After representing Scotland at the 2015 Netball World Cup, Mulheron stayed on in Australia. She subsequently played for three teams in the Australian Netball League. In 2016 she played for Canberra Darters
and in 2017 she played for New South Wales Waratahs. She was also named in the 2018 Queensland Fusion squad.

State leagues
Mulheron has played in the Netball NSW Premier League. In 2016 she played for GWS Fury and in 2017 she played for Panthers. She has also played in the HART Sapphire Series. In 2020 she played for
Carina Leagues Club Tigers and in 2021 she played for Brisbane South Wildcats.

Scotland
Mulheron has represented Scotland at the 2007, 2015 and 2019 Netball World Cups. She also represented Scotland at the 2014 and 2018 Commonwealth Games. She was vice captain at the 2014 tournament. She captained Scotland at the 2015 Netball World Cup.

References

1986 births
Living people
Scottish netball players
Netball players at the 2014 Commonwealth Games
Netball players at the 2018 Commonwealth Games
Commonwealth Games competitors for Scotland
2007 World Netball Championships players
2015 Netball World Cup players
2019 Netball World Cup players
Netball Superleague players
Team Northumbria netball players
Sirens Netball players
Australian Netball League players
Canberra Darters (ANL) players
Netball New South Wales Waratahs players
Queensland Fusion players
Queensland state netball league players
New South Wales state netball league players
Scottish expatriate sportspeople in Australia
Sportspeople from Glasgow